Coleophora prunifoliae is a moth of the family Coleophoridae. It is found from Scandinavia to the Pyrenees, Italy and Romania and from Great Britain to southern Russia.

The wingspan is 10–12 mm.

The larvae feed on Betula, Cotoneaster franchetii, Crataegus, Cydonia oblonga, Malus domestica, Prunus armeniaca, Prunus avium, Prunus cerasus, Prunus domestica insititia, Prunus mahaleb, Prunus serrulata, Prunus spinosa, Pyracantha coccinea, Sorbus aria and Sorbus aucuparia. They create a tubular leaf case of 6–7 mm long. It is light, but later dark brown, trivalved and has a mouth angle of 45°. The larva lives at the underside of the leaf, and makes sizable fleck mines. Full-grown larvae can be found at the end of May.

References

prunifoliae
Moths of Europe
Moths described in 1944